Steven Blush is an American author, journalist, record collector and film maker who is best known for his book American Hardcore and the movie of the same name. Blush has written five books, is the founder of Seconds magazine and has written articles for many magazines.  Two of his books have been made into movies.  Blush's work mainly specializes in hardcore punk music.

Background
Blush grew up in a Jewish family in suburban New Jersey. He would travel into the Lower East Side of Manhattan in New York City with his father who owned a print shop there. In New York he would frequent music bars like CBGB and the Lismar Lounge and stores like Trash and Vaudeville. He witnessed the start of bands like the Ramones and Talking Heads and he found that he enjoyed small scale shows like that over larger shows like Led Zeppelin. He spent some time in England where he discovered UK punk bands like the Clash and Sham 69. He moved to Washington, D.C. to attend George Washington University, with a view to becoming a lawyer, but that changed when he saw his first Black Flag concert there, which led to his getting involved with hardcore, working with bands like Black Flag, Minor Threat, the Circle Jerks and the Dead Kennedys. he briefly managed the noise band No Trend.

Blush was a DJ for the college radio station and would play hardcore bands on the air.  He booked his first show through the radio station, booking the Dead Kennedys to play in the college cafeteria. After graduation, he returned to New York where he would DJ in many clubs in the city.

Currently Blush is a regular speaker at talk shows and events like the CMJ in New York.

Journalist
Even though Blush had no experience as a journalist, he started writing articles for magazines such as Spin, Details and Kerrang!.  His first assignment was an interview with local hardcore band, the Cro-Mags. He was the senior editor at Paper and he started his own magazine called Seconds, where his interviews included Glenn Danzig of the Misfits. Forty-five of Blush's interviews, conducted over his 18 years with Seconds magazine, were compiled into a book called .45 Dangerous Minds: The Most Intense Interviews From Seconds Magazine (The Art of the Interview). He has also written for Vice, High Times, The Village Voice and Interview

Author

American Hardcore
After moving on from Seconds magazine, Blush decided to chronicle his hardcore musical journey in a book. He started writing the book, American Hardcore, in the mid-1990s when bands like Green Day and The Offspring were popular.  He saw a documentary titled The History of Rock and Roll on PBS, which he described as going "straight from the Sex Pistols and Clash (I believe it mentions X) to Nirvana, as if this decade had never happened. It was like the untold story of rock." Blush said that hardcore was like a "dirty little secret that nobody really talked about when it came to music." The book is Blush's first hand account of the hardcore music scene from 1980 to 1986 and it exposed the punk rock underground lifestyle to a more mainstream audience, revealing it as an alternative to what many considered the life of a "rock star".

The Punknews.org review said that Blush "attempted and made a really good effort to cover every scene from every area around the country." The A.V. Club said is "absolutely essential reading"

In 2006 a movie version of the book was produced, which included interviews with bands such as Black Flag, Minor Threat and Bad Brains. The Dead Kennedys and Misfits declined to participate. The file was an official selection of both the Sundance Film Festival and the Toronto Film Festival.

American Hair Metal
Blush's second book, American Hair Metal, was written partially to buck conformity. Blush discovered hair metal through the band Cinderella.  Even though he was a "punk dude", he appreciated their "majestic bluesy groove". Other bands covered in the book include Britny Fox, Danger Danger, Roxx Gang, Vinnie Vincent Invasion, and Nitro.

Spin said: "In the '80s, before decorum was invented, we liked our rockers flammably coiffed.  Author Steven Blush's 'American Hair Metal' remembers that era with philosophical quips from Poison and Mötley Crüe."

Lost Rockers
Lost Rockers profiles the lives of certain artists and musicians who almost made it to the big time but did not.  These folks knew all the right people, etc. but somehow they never crossed the line into stardom and are largely now forgotten.

In 2017 a movie was made of the book.

New York Rock
New York Rock chronicles the music of the city, starting with the rise of the Velvet Underground in 1966, to the closing of the CBGB bar in 2006, some 40 years later.  Blush chose those milestones because he believed the Velvet Underground where the first rock and roll band to appeal to "adult sensibilities", and because he felt that the end of CBGB marked the end of an era.

In a review for The Big Takeover, critic James Mann said that Blush has "brought together a wealth of history charting the rise of rock and roll in the Big Apple". The Kirkus Review described the book as a "brisk overview of New York City's rock 'n' roll tradition, from doo-wop to hard core, mirroring the city's transformations. Writing for AM New York, Hal Bienstock said: "Author, promoter and DJ Steven Blush has been covering the scene for decades, and his new book is a comprehensive look at the city's rock music, highlighting both the legends and the lesser-known acts."  DJ Jason said "It's actually pretty amazing that something so special and prosperous in NYC has been overlooked by journalists for so long."

Bibliography

Books
 American Hardcore: A Tribal History – October 2001
.45 Dangerous Minds – March 28, 2005
American Hair Metal – October 1, 2006
 American Hardcore: A Tribal History (Second Edition) – October 2010
Lost Rockers: Broken Dreams and Crashed Careers – March 8, 2016
New York Rock: From the Rise of The Velvet Underground to the Fall of CBGB – October 4, 2016

Films
 American Hardcore (2006)
Lost Rockers (2012)

Articles
 Has written for most others including:

Seconds
 Paper
 Vice
 Spin
 Details
Kerrang!
 The Village Voice

References – Blush's books

References – Blush's articles

References

External links
 Excerpts from American Hardcore
  – stevenblush.com

American non-fiction writers
American screenwriters
American music journalists